Robert Lepikson (14 June 1952 – 1 July 2006) was an Estonian politician, businessman and rally driver/co-driver.

As a rally driver, he was the Estonian champion three times, winner of the Baltic Cup and was the head of the Estonian motosport league.

As a politician, he switched party memberships several times, having been a member of the Estonian Coalition Party, the Estonian Centre Party and the People's Union of Estonia. He was the mayor of Tallinn for 7 months in 1996 and 1997. He lost his position as a result of conflicts caused by his out-spoken nature regarding fellow politicians in public.

In 1999, he was involved in a scandal in Estonian politics, in which Mart Laar used Edgar Savisaar's picture as a target on a shooting range.

He died of a stroke in 2006.

References

External links
Eesti Ekspress: Kogu südamega 
Robert Lepiksoni Riigikogu liikme lehekülg 

1952 births
2006 deaths
Mayors of Tallinn
Politicians from Tallinn
Sportspeople from Tallinn
Estonian rally drivers
Estonian rally co-drivers
Estonian Centre Party politicians
People's Union of Estonia politicians
Ministers of the Interior of Estonia
Estonian Coalition Party politicians
20th-century Estonian politicians
21st-century Estonian politicians
Members of the Riigikogu, 2003–2007